Estland may refer to:

 Estland,  the modern name for Estonia in several languages
Danish duchy of Estonia, a dominum directum of the King of Denmark from 1219 until 1346 in what is now Northern Estonia until it was sold and became:
 A dominion of the Livonian Order within Terra Mariana in 1346–1561, until it was conquered by the Swedish Empire in the Livonian War and became:
 The Swedish duchy of Estonia in 1561–1721 until conquered by the Tsardom of Russia in the Great Northern War and became:
 The Governorate of Estonia of the Russian Empire in 1721–1917
 An island in the Atlantic Ocean on the 1558 Venetian Zeno map, possibly corresponding to Shetland